AK-100 may refer to:
 AK-100 Naval gun, a Russian 100mm naval gun system
 AK-100 (rifle family), Russian assault rifle family